Kam is a given name, nickname or surname.

Given name
As a given name, Kam may be short for Kameron, which is a variant of Cameron, a given name which originated from a Scottish surname. Another similar shortened form is Cam.

People with the given name or nickname Kam include:

Kam Chancellor (born 1988), American National Football League player
Kam Fong Chun (1918–2002), American actor best known for playing Chin Ho in the original television series Hawaii Five-O
Kam Franklin (born 1987), American singer-songwriter
Kam Heskin (born 1973), American actress
Kam Lee (born 1966), American death metal musician
Kam McLeod (died 2019), Canadian fugitive
Kam Mickolio (born 1984), American baseball pitcher
Kam Selem, Inspector General of the Nigerian Police (1966–1975)
Kam Tang, British illustrator
Kam Yuen (born 1938), Chinese-born American martial arts expert

Surname

Origins
As a Chinese surname, Kam may be a spelling of the pronunciation in different varieties of Chinese of the following surnames, listed based on their Pinyin spelling (which reflects the Mandarin Chinese pronunciation):
Gān, spelled Kam based on its Cantonese, Hakka, and Hokkien pronunciations
Jīn, homophonous with the above surname in Cantonese, though not in other varieties of Chinese
Qín, spelled Kam based on its Cantonese pronunciation

The Dutch surname Kam originated in multiple ways. As an occupational surname, it came from both Dutch  meaning "comb" (referring metonymically to comb makers, wool combers, or fullers), or from Middle Dutch  meaning "brewery". As a toponymic surname, it is a reduced form of Van Kam, referring to Chaam (formerly spelled Kam) in North Brabant, near Breda.

The Jewish surname Kam (Yiddish and ), also spelled Kamm, originated from various German words, including Middle High German  "mould" or  "comb".

As a Korean surname, Kam is the McCune–Reischauer and Yale Romanization spelling of the surname transcribed in the Revised Romanization of Korean as Gam; it is written using the same character as for the Chinese surname Gān mentioned above. It was one of eighteen Korean clans founded by Yuan Dynasty officials who accompanied princesses to Korea.

Statistics

In the Netherlands, there were 157 people with the surname Kam as of 2007, up from 38 in 1947.

The 2000 South Korean census found 5,998 people in 1,910 households with the surname. A study by the National Institute of the Korean Language based on 2007 application data for South Korean passports found that 70% of applicants with this family name spelled it in Latin letters as Kam in their passports, while 20% spelled it Gam. Rarer alternative spellings included Kahm.

The 2010 United States Census found 3,749 people with the surname Kam, making it the 8,749th-most-common name in the country. This represented an increase from 3,358 (8,954th-most-common) in the 2000 Census. In both censuses, slightly more than 70% of the bearers of the surname identified as Asian, and about 15% as White. It was the 404th-most-common surname among respondents to the 2000 Census who identified as Asian.

People with the surname
Surname :
Alex Kam (born 1995), South Korean figure skater
Genervie Kam (born 1980), Malaysian classical musician
Kam Nai-wai (born 1960), Hong Kong politician
Kam Ning, Singaporean violinist
Richard Kam (born 1996), South Korean ice dancer, younger brother of Alex
Kam Wai Leung (born 1950), Hong Kong fencer
Kam Woo-sung (born 1970), South Korean actor

Surname :
Elaine Kam (born 1954), Taiwan-born Hong Kong actress
Peter Kam (born 1961), Hong Kong film music composer

Other:
Anat Kam or Kamm, (born 1987), Israeli journalist
Isca Kam (born 1980), Nauruan weightlifter
Joseph Kam (1769–1833), Dutch missionary in Indonesia
Lyn-Wannan Kam, Nauruan politician
Moshe Kam (born 1955), Israeli electrical engineer and academic 
Roray Kam (born 1961), American surfer
Sharon Kam (born 1971), Israeli classical clarinetist
Sophie Heidi Kam (born 1969), Burkinabe writer
Søren Kam (born 1921), Danish World War II Waffen-SS officer and wanted Nazi war criminal

References

Chinese-language surnames
Dutch-language surnames
Korean-language surnames
Yiddish-language surnames
Multiple Chinese surnames
Lists of people by nickname
Hypocorisms